The 1st Guards Reserve Division (1. Garde-Reserve-Division) was a reserve infantry division of the Imperial German Army in World War I.  It was a reserve formation of the Prussian Guards, the elite regiments raised throughout the Kingdom of Prussia. It was formed on mobilization in August 1914 as part of the Guards Reserve Corps and dissolved in 1919 during the demobilization of the German Army after the Armistice.

The division saw action on both the Western and Eastern Fronts during World War I.  It was not heavily engaged in the war's major well-known battles, but was rated by Allied intelligence as a dependable division willing to take losses to hold and retake the line.

Order of battle on mobilization

On mobilization in August 1914, the reserves of the Prussian Guards were called up and formed into the 1st Guard Reserve Division. The 1st Guard Reserve Division's initial wartime organization was as follows:

1.Garde-Reserve-Infanterie-Brigade:
1. Garde-Reserve-Infanterie-Regiment
2. Garde-Reserve-Infanterie-Regiment
Garde-Reserve-Jäger-Bataillon
15.Reserve-Infanterie-Brigade:
Reserve-Infanterie-Regiment Nr. 64
Reserve-Infanterie-Regiment Nr. 93
Garde-Reserve-Schützen-Bataillon
Garde-Reserve-Dragoner-Regiment
Garde-Reserve-Feldartillerie-Brigade:
1.Garde-Reserve-Feldartillerie-Regiment
3.Garde-Reserve-Feldartillerie-Regiment
2./2. Brandenburgisches Pionier-Bataillon Nr. 28
3./2. Brandenburgisches Pionier-Bataillon Nr. 28

Order of battle on February 23, 1918
Divisions underwent many changes during the war, with regiments moving from division to division, and some being destroyed and rebuilt.  During the war, most divisions became triangular - one infantry brigade with three infantry regiments rather than two infantry brigades of two regiments (a "square division"). An artillery commander replaced the artillery brigade headquarters, the cavalry was further reduced, the engineer contingent was increased, and a divisional signals command was created. The 1st Guard Reserve Division's order of battle on February 23, 1918, was as follows:

1. Garde-Reserve-Infanterie-Brigade:
1. Garde-Reserve-Infanterie-Regiment
2. Garde-Reserve-Infanterie-Regiment
Garde-Reserve-Infanterie-Regiment Nr. 64
MG-Scharfschützen-Abteilung Nr. 70
1. Eskadron/Garde-Reserve-Dragoner-Regiment
Garde-Artillerie-Kommandeur 8:
1.Garde-Reserve-Feldartillerie-Regiment
II./2.Garde-Reserve-Fußartillerie-Regiment
Stab 2. Brandenburgisches Pionier-Bataillon Nr. 28:
2./2. Brandenburgisches Pionier-Bataillon Nr. 28
3./2. Brandenburgisches Pionier-Bataillon Nr. 28
5.Garde-Minenwerfer-Kompanie
Divisions-Nachrichten-Abteilung Nr. 401

References
 1.Garde-Reserve-Division - Der erste Weltkrieg
 Histories of Two Hundred and Fifty-One Divisions of the German Army which Participated in the War (1914-1918), compiled from records of Intelligence section of the General Staff, American Expeditionary Forces, at General Headquarters, Chaumont, France 1919 (1920, online)
 Hermann Cron et al., Ruhmeshalle unserer alten Armee (Berlin, 1935)
 Hermann Cron, Geschichte des deutschen Heeres im Weltkriege 1914-1918 (Berlin, 1937)

External links  
 Histories of two hundred and fifty-one divisions of the German army which participated in the war (1914-1918) (p. 22-25)

Notes

Military units and formations established in 1914
Military units and formations disestablished in 1919
1914 establishments in Germany
Infantry divisions of Germany in World War I